The Kohl Mythos (myth or story) is a German observation ultralight aircraft, designed by Stefan Kohl, and produced by S.A.I. Aeronautica, later by German Aircraft GmbH and most recently by Officine Meccaniche Mingarelli (OMM). When it was available the aircraft is supplied as a kit for amateur construction or complete and ready-to-fly.

The Mythos started out as the S.A.I. Aeronautica G97 Spotter. Later, production was moved to German Aircraft GmbH and the design sold as the German Aircraft Sky-Maxx. After unsuccessful marketing, the designer decided to have the aircraft produced himself under contract in Italy by Officine Meccaniche Mingarelli and it was then sold as the OMM M-7 Servator.

The Mythos is intended for the observation role and in particular agricultural research, forestry, law enforcement, flight training, sightseeing, aerial photography and cattle mustering.

Design and development
The aircraft was designed to comply with the Fédération Aéronautique Internationale microlight rules. It features a cantilever high-wing, a two-seats-in-side-by-side configuration enclosed cockpit, fixed tricycle landing gear and a single engine in pusher configuration. The aircraft has extensive glazing to allow maximum visibility.

The aircraft is made from aluminum sheet. Standard engines available are the  Rotax 912ULS and the  ULPower UL260i four-stroke powerplants.

OMM completed French and German ultralight certification in the middle of 2012. The company seems to have gone out of business in 2013, though.

Operational history
Reviewer Marino Boric described the design in a 2015 review as having, "slow flying capabilities and excellent cockpit visibility that is among the best of all aircraft in its category especially with the legendary transparent nose section".

Specifications (Mythos)

References

External links

2000s German ultralight aircraft
Single-engined pusher aircraft